Geraint Paul Jones is a British educator. He is the founding executive director of the National School of Education and Teaching at Coventry University, where he is also an associate pro-vice-chancellor and professor of education. 

In 2007 Jones won a national education award for pioneering a new school day structure at St. Edmund’s School – a state-maintained secondary school in Salisbury, Wiltshire. He also wrote Wake ’n Shake, a globally successful physical activity programme for school children now practised in over 20,000 schools worldwide. Jones gave the programme to schools free of charge. 

He was involved in implementing the education strategy for London’s successful bid to host the 2012 Olympic Games, and he represented UK schools at the announcement ceremony in Singapore. He has acted as an advisor to government education ministries in the UK, South East Asia and the UAE. He is also an Ofsted inspector.

Jones became head and then principal of Quinton House School in Northamptonshire, England, in 2008. Prior to his appointment, the school was judged as “satisfactory” by schools inspectorate Ofsted. Under Jones’ leadership, it became England’s highest performing school for GCSE results.

Jones was then appointed as chief education officer of the school’s parent company, Cognita, a group of over 80 schools across the world. The group’s chairman was Her Majesty’s former chief inspector of schools, Sir Chris Woodhead. 

Jones became dean of the School of Education at the University of Buckingham in 2014. He grew the school to become the largest provider of Initial Teacher Training in England. In 2018 Jones moved to Coventry University, where he established the new National School of Education & Teaching.

Education

Between 1988 and 1995 Jones attended the Welsh-speaking Ysgol Llanhari (Llanhari School) in Rhondda Cynon Taff, South Wales.

He gained a first degree in German from Swansea University, where he also studied Russian.  He undertook initial teacher training at Swansea University, where he gained a Postgraduate Certificate in Education with Qualified Teacher Status (PGCE with QTS). In 2005 he gained the National Professional Qualification for Headship (NPQH), and in 2009 a master's degree in Educational Leadership from the University of Buckingham.

Career 

Jones was a part-time police officer with South Wales Police during his degree studies. After gaining his PGCE he worked as a teacher of languages and physical education at Kingdown School in Warminster, Wiltshire. He then joined St Edmund’s School in Salisbury, where he progressed to become the school’s vice principal.

During his time at St Edmund’s Jones trained to become an Ofsted inspector. He inspected schools in England and in the Middle East. 

He joined the Cognita School’s Group in 2008 as headteacher and principal of Quinton House School in Northampton. He is known for turning the school around to become one of the most successful schools in the UK. Its Ofsted report of 2010 judged the school as “highly successful in fulfilling its stated aims because the passionate inspiration of the Principal engenders an ethos in which all students feel valued and nurtured.”

Jones became Cognita’s chief education officer in late 2012, and then dean of education at the University of Buckingham in 2014, where he was awarded a professorship. At Buckingham, Jones oversaw unprecedented growth at the School of Education, which, by 2018 accounted for 60% of the university’s entire student population.

In late 2018 Jones left Buckingham to start and lead the National School of Education and Teaching (NSET) at Coventry University, where he is executive director and associate pro-vice-chancellor. He is also professor of education at the university. In 2019 NSET became the first and only university since the Conservative government took office in 2010 to receive accreditation to recommend the award of Qualified Teacher Status in England. In its first year NSET became one of England’s largest teacher training providers.

Media 

Jones writes regularly on educational issues in the British national press.  Jones interviewed the late Sir Chris Woodhead for the Sunday Times and broke the news of his battle with cancer.  Following Woodhead’s death in 2014, Jones was interviewed on BBC Radio 4’s Last Word, in which he described Woodhead as having “dignified the teaching profession”.

References

Living people
Welsh educators
Academics of the University of Buckingham
Year of birth missing (living people)